Staraya Sloboda is the name of several rural localities in Russia:
Staraya Sloboda, Kaluga Oblast, a village in Baryatinsky District of Kaluga Oblast
Staraya Sloboda, Leningrad Oblast, a village in Yanegskoye Settlement Municipal Formation of Lodeynopolsky District in Leningrad Oblast
Staraya Sloboda, Moscow Oblast, a village in Grebnevskoye Rural Settlement of Shchyolkovsky District in Moscow Oblast
Staraya Sloboda, Smolensk Oblast, a village in Nikolskoye Rural Settlement of Gagarinsky District in Smolensk Oblast
Staraya Sloboda, Vladimir Oblast, a selo in Alexandrovsky District of Vladimir Oblast